Racu (meaning "Place with the Crabs of Csík") is a commune in Harghita County, Romania. It lies in the Székely Land, an ethno-cultural region in eastern Transylvania.

Component villages 
The commune is composed of two villages:

Gârciu village was called Satu Nou from 1964 until 2011.

History 
The villages were part of the Székely Land region of the historical Transylvania province. They belonged to Csíkszék district. After the administrative reform of Transylvania in 1876, they fell within the Csík County in the Kingdom of Hungary. After the Treaty of Trianon of 1920, they became part of Romania and fell within Ciuc County during the interwar period. In 1940, the second Vienna Award granted Northern Transylvania to Hungary and the villages were held by Hungary until 1944. After Soviet occupation, the Romanian administration returned and the commune became officially part of Romania in 1947. Between 1952 and 1960, the commune fell within the Magyar Autonomous Region, between 1960 and 1968 the Mureș-Magyar Autonomous Region. In 1968, the province was abolished, and since then, the commune has been part of Harghita County.

Demographics
The commune has an absolute Hungarian (Székely) majority. According to the 2011 census it has a population of 1,587 which 99,5% or 1,579 are Hungarian.
Formerly part of Siculeni commune, the two villages broke off in 2004.

Twinnings 
 Boda, Hungary

Maps

References

Communes in Harghita County
Localities in Transylvania
Székely communities